Wilking José Rodríguez Carrasco (born March 2, 1990) is a Venezuelan professional baseball pitcher for the St. Louis Cardinals of Major League Baseball (MLB). In 2007, Rodríguez signed with the Tampa Bay Rays as an international free agent. He previously pitched two innings in MLB for the Kansas City Royals in 2014.

Career

Tampa Bay Rays
On February 26, 2007, Rodríguez signed with the Tampa Bay Rays as an international free agent. Rodríguez made his professional debut in 2007 in the Venezuelan Summer League and posted a 1.95 ERA in 17 appearances. He returned to the Venezuelan Summer League Rays the following year and pitched to a 3.71 ERA in 10 games. In 2009, Rodríguez played for the rookie-level Princeton Rays and recorded a 1-6 record and 3.21 ERA in 13 starts with the team. Rodríguez spent the 2010 season with the Single-A Bowling Green Hot Rods, pitching to a 4-10 record and 4.23 ERA with 93 strikeouts in 106.1 innings of work. He split the 2011 season between Bowling Green and the Low-A Hudson Valley Renegades, accumulating a 1-4 record and 5.00 ERA in 11 appearances between the two teams.

On November 18, 2011, Rodríguez was added to the Rays' 40 man roster to protect him from the Rule 5 draft. Before the 2012 season, he ranked as the Rays' 20th best prospect, Rodríguez played for the High-A Charlotte Stone Crabs in 2012, logging an 0-4 record and 5.56 ERA in 7 starts. On October 20, 2012, Rodríguez was outrighted off of the 40-man roster. He played in 8 games for the rookie-level GCL Rays in 2013, missing a portion of the year due to injury, and pitched 9.0 scoreless innings for the team. On November 4, 2013, he elected free agency.

Kansas City Royals
On November 23, 2013, Rodríguez signed a minor league contract with the Kansas City Royals organization. He was assigned to the Double-A Northwest Arkansas Naturals to begin the 2014 season and later received a promotion to the Triple-A Omaha Storm Chasers.

On June 2, 2014, the Royals selected Rodríguez's contract from Triple-A, and promoted him to the major leagues for the first time. Rodríguez made 2 appearances for the Royals, pitching 2 scoreless innings, before he was optioned back down to Omaha. He was placed on release waivers by the Royals on August 11.

New York Yankees
On August 18, 2014, Rodríguez signed a minor league contract with the New York Yankees organization. He was invited to spring training with the Yankees for the 2015 season, but did not make the team and was assigned to the Triple-A Scranton/Wilkes-Barre RailRiders to begin the season. On April 15, 2015, Rodríguez was suspended 80 games for a PED violation. In seven appearances for Scranton, Rodríguez registered a 2-0 record and 1.69 ERA. He became a free agent on November 6, 2015.

Rieleros de Aguascalientes
On January 1, 2020, after spending the past 4 seasons out of affiliated ball, Rodríguez signed with the Rieleros de Aguascalientes of the Mexican League. Rodríguez did not play in a game in 2020 due to the cancellation of the Mexican League season because of the COVID-19 pandemic. On May 28, 2021, Rodríguez re-signed with Aguascalientes. Rodríguez recorded a 3.86 ERA in 13 appearances with the Rieleros.

Tecolotes de los Dos Laredos
On July 18, 2021, Rodríguez was signed off waivers by the Tecolotes de los Dos Laredos of the Mexican League.

New York Yankees (second stint)
On August 30, 2022, Rodriguez signed a minor league deal with the New York Yankees.

St. Louis Cardinals
On December 7, 2022, Rodriguez was selected by the St. Louis Cardinals in the 2022 Rule 5 draft.

See also
 List of Major League Baseball players from Venezuela
 Rule 5 draft results

References

External links

1990 births
Living people
Bowling Green Hot Rods players
Charlotte Stone Crabs players
Gulf Coast Rays players
Hudson Valley Renegades players
Kansas City Royals players
Major League Baseball pitchers
Major League Baseball players from Venezuela
Navegantes del Magallanes players
Northwest Arkansas Naturals players
Omaha Storm Chasers players
People from Puerto Cabello
Princeton Rays players
Rieleros de Aguascalientes players
Scranton/Wilkes-Barre RailRiders players
Tecolotes de los Dos Laredos players
Venezuelan expatriate baseball players in Mexico
Venezuelan expatriate baseball players in the United States
Venezuelan Summer League Devil Rays/Reds players
Venezuelan Summer League Rays players
Venezuelan expatriate baseball players in Italy